The M621 is a 20 mm automatic cannon of French design, developed by Nexter as on-board armament for armored vehicles, aircraft, helicopters and small coastal vessels of the French Navy.

Variants

THL 20 
Turreted cannon for helicopters.

POD NC 621 
Cannon pod for helicopters and light aircraft.

ARX 20 
Remotely controlled weapon station with M621 and a 7.62×51mm machinegun.

SH20 
Door mounted cannon for helicopters.

CP 20 
Pintle-mounted cannon for vehicles and boats.

15A 
Cannon for naval ships.

NARWHAL 
As remote-controlled naval gun on the Nexter Narwhal 20A.

See also 
GIAT 30
20 mm modèle F2 gun

References

20x102mm
Aircraft guns
Autocannon
Artillery of France
Nexter Systems